St. Hopkins College is a business school located in Bangalore, India. It was founded by Yunus Ahmed in 2009 and is a minority institution approved by the National Commission for Minority Educational Institutions, the University Grants Commission of India and the National Assessment and Accreditation Council. St. Hopkins is affiliated to the University of Bangalore and the Government of Karnataka.

Courses offered

Undergraduate program
St. Hopkins offers courses and programs for the B.B.M., B.Com, B.C.A. and B.A. There are also pre-university courses.

Graduate program
Postgraduate courses offered include:
 M.Com
 MBA in Finance
 MBA in Human Resource Management
 MBA in Retail
 MBA in Marketing 
 MBA in Business Analytics
 MBA in Information Technology
 International MBA (6 weeks abroad)
 Postgraduate Diploma in Business Analytics

Collaborations
 Bangalore University 
 Mysore University 
 Naukri for Placements

Activities
St. Hopkins College organizes UDAAN, an annual cultural fest held at the college campus, followed by inter-class sports competition.

The Boys Football team has won the Karnataka State Football Tournament.

References

External links
 

Business schools in Bangalore
Colleges affiliated to Bangalore University
Colleges in Bangalore
Educational institutions established in 2009
2009 establishments in Karnataka